Tommy Wright III is an American rapper and hip hop producer. He began rapping in Memphis, Tennessee during the 1990s and is considered to be an early pioneer for fast-paced rap and trap production in South Memphis.

Musical career 
Growing up in Memphis, Tommy Wright began producing music using four-track recording equipment. Between 1992 and 2001, he released five self-produced solo albums, one with N.O.D., and two more with group Ten Wanted Men, owned, operated and produced the entirety of Street Smart Record's discography and previewed – if possibly never distributed – a street documentary, Behind Closed Doors, for which there's also a soundtrack.

Resurgence 
Despite stepping back from the music industry after 2001's Behind Closed Doors (Da Soundtrack), Tommy Wright III maintained a cult following through the 2000s and 2010s.

Tommy Wright III collaborated with Bay Area rapper Lil B on Secret, a song on the latter's 2019 mixtape, Loyalty Casket.

Discography

Albums 
 Memphis Massacre (cassette, mini album, mixed), 1992
 Ashes 2 Ashes, Dust 2 Dust, 1994
 Runnin-N-Gunnin (cassette, album), 1995
 Tommy Wright & Ten Wanted Men – Wanted Dead or Alive (cassette, album), 1995
 On the Run, 1996
 Tommy Wright* & Ten Wanted Men – 10 Toes Down (cassette, album), 1997
 Feel Me Before They Kill Me, 1998
 NASHVILLE TAKEOVER (cassette, album), 2016

Compilations 

 Greatest Hits (cassette, compilation), 1997
 Genesis (Greatest Underground Hits), 2000
 Behind Closed Doors (Da Soundtrack), 2001

References 

1976 births
Living people
Rappers from Memphis, Tennessee
African-American male rappers
21st-century African-American people
20th-century African-American people